Mares's leaf-toed gecko (Phyllodactylus maresi) is a species of gecko. It is endemic to the Galapagos Islands.

References

Phyllodactylus
Endemic reptiles of the Galápagos Islands
Reptiles described in 1973
Taxa named by Benedetto Lanza